Thiemo Carsten Jannick de Bakker (born 19 September 1988) is a Dutch professional tennis player. Considered a top prospect of his generation as a junior, he also made an impressive breakthrough as a young pro, reaching a career-high ranking in singles of World No. 40 achieved on 19 July 2010 and World No. 115 in doubles achieved on 10 February 2014. However, in a career largely plagued by injuries and inconsistencies afterwards, he was never quite able to build on his early career success.

Career

Junior career
De Bakker finished 2006 as the ITF Junior Champion, after having won the Boys' Singles title at the 2006 Wimbledon Championships.

Early career
De Bakker received a wild card into the ATP Amersfoort event in July 2006 and defeated top 100 and French Open Quarterfinalist Julien Benneteau in the 1st round, winning in straight sets 6–3, 6–3. In the 2nd round he faced Frenchman Marc Gicquel and lost in 3 sets. As he was the reigning Junior Champion, De Bakker received a wild card into the main draw of the 2007 Wimbledon Championships, where he would lose in 5 tight sets to qualifier Wayne Arthurs.
In October 2006, De Bakker won his first senior international title in a Futures event in Albufeira, Portugal, where he beat Briton Morgan Phillips in the final. This was followed by another win in a Futures tournament two weeks later in San Miguel, Portugal. He reached a career high ATP ranking of 228 on 25 August 2008.

2009
On 22 March 2009, he finished as runner-up in the Caltanissetta Challenger tournament to compatriot Jesse Huta Galung, losing in straight sets. On 5 May 2009, as a qualifier and ranked 236, he defeated the 5th seed Rainer Schüttler in the first round of the BMW Open in Münich in straight sets, before losing to former world number one, Lleyton Hewitt. De Bakker would follow this up in the 2009 Ordina Open, by qualifying for the tournament and losing in the second round to Rainer Schüttler, after defeating Björn Phau in three tight sets. De Bakker hit a rich vein of form in August, winning four Challenger tournaments, and bumping his ranking from 256 to 122, in the span of one month. His form continued in Davis Cup competition, by beating World Number 13 Gaël Monfils in 4 sets, and putting the Netherlands up 1–0 on France, but lost to Jo-Wilfried Tsonga in four tight sets. De Bakker would finish the year ranked 96th.

2010

De Bakker started 2010 in much the same way he finished 2009. He reached the quarter-finals of the 2010 Aircel Chennai Open, after defeating the eighth seed, Rajeev Ram, and compatriot Robin Haase, he lost to Janko Tipsarević. This would boost his ranking to number 81 in the world, and gave him a high enough ranking to receive direct entrance into the 2010 Australian Open men's singles.
In his first Grand Slam in three years, the Dutchman was paired up against the 6th seed Andy Roddick. After losing the first set, de Bakker lost the second and third set by one break each.

De Bakker's next tournament was his first ever Masters event, the 2010 BNP Paribas Open in Indian Wells. He started off winning his opening match against Marcos Daniel in straight sets, before advancing to the third round after beating 30th seed Janko Tipsarević where he retired just after five games of play at 3–2 first set. In the third round, he fell to eventual finalist Andy Roddick.
De Bakker played his second Masters event two weeks later the 2010 Sony Ericsson Open, winning his first round match against Rajeev Ram in straight sets, before falling again to the eventual finalist, this time Tomáš Berdych with the same scoreline as in Indian Wells.

De Bakker's next Masters event was the 2010 Monte-Carlo Rolex Masters, where he had to qualify this time. After defeating Eduardo Schwank, de Bakker lost to the five-time reigning champion, and world number two, Rafael Nadal. De Bakker lost this match in less than an hour, winning one game in a two sets loss.
He then appeared at the 2010 Barcelona Open Banco Sabadell. He took out World No.58 Alejandro Falla, followed by a victory over world No.92 Daniel Gimeno-Traver. In the round of 16, he scored a win over World No.16 (and former World #1) Juan Carlos Ferrero. Before the match, Ferrero had an 18–2 record on clay for the year. He followed it up with his best career victory, with a superb performance to take out World No.10 Jo-Wilfried Tsonga, his first win over a top 10 player. However, his run came to an end against World No.8 Robin Söderling in the semifinals. Thiemo rose to a career high World No.50 as a result of his semifinal appearance there.

Following his performance at Barcelona, de Bakker received a Special Exempt to enter the main draw of Rome Masters where he faced Viktor Troicki in the first round, but retired due to a groin injury.
At the 2010 French Open, he made a third round showing where he lost to an injured Jo-Wilfried Tsonga in four sets.

At the 2010 Wimbledon Championships, de Bakker advanced to the third round of the men's singles tournament after defeating Colombian Santiago Giraldo in a hotly contested five sets win, followed by a more comprehensive defeat of an exhausted John Isner, the winner of the longest tennis match in history, which finished on its third day of play on 24 June, 6–0, 6–3, 6–2. This made Bakker the first, and one of only two players in history to bagel Isner (the other being Jannik Sinner in 2021), before losing in the third round to Paul-Henri Mathieu of France. De Bakker also participated in the men's doubles tournament, in which his partner was his Dutch colleague Haase. After defeating Viktor Troicki and Christopher Kas in the first round, they lost to the Ratiwatana twins, who entered the main tournament as lucky losers, in 4 sets. As a result, he reached the top 40 in singles on 19 July 2010.

At the 2010 Pilot Pen Tennis, Thiemo reached his second ATP semi-final. Sergiy Stakhovsky defeated him in two sets.

ATP career finals

Doubles: 1 (1 runner-up)

Challenger and Futures finals

Singles: 32 (22–10)

Doubles: 15 (11–4)

Singles performance timeline

Current till 2018 Rotterdam Open.

Wins over top 10 players

References

External links

Official website
 
 
 
De Bakker Recent Match Results
De Bakker World Ranking History

1988 births
Living people
People from 's-Gravenzande
Dutch male tennis players
Sportspeople from The Hague
Wimbledon junior champions
Grand Slam (tennis) champions in boys' singles